t.

0.9,

References

1972 births
Living people
People from Montevideo
Uruguayan footballers
Association football midfielders
Villa Española players
Puerto Montt footballers
Uruguayan Primera División players
Expatriate footballers in Chile
Uruguayan expatriate footballers

84-89river plate  89 -93 club Atlético cerró.Libertadores.93-95 deportivo Español y Almagro 95 Villa español a.97.Tenerife.Villa español a 2000.Deportes puerto Montt y Cobresal 2002.